Vojin Menković (born October 20, 1982) is a Serbian handball
player, currently playing for HT Tatran Prešov in the Slovak Extraliga.
He also played in RK Crvena zvezda, Xant Thessalonike, HC Odorheiu Secuiesc and Al Rayyan Sports Club

External links
 Presov sign Vojin Menkovic
 Profile at ehfcl.com

1982 births
Living people
Serbian male handball players